ITU TRIGA Mark-II Training and Research Reactor is a nuclear research reactor located in Istanbul Technical University in Turkey. It is a light water reactor, the 54th TRIGA in the world designed and manufactured by General Atomics. The facility was opened on 11 March 1979.

It is second operational and third installed nuclear research reactors in Turkey, the other being in Çekmece Nuclear Research and Education Center.

References

External links 
 ITU Triga Mark 2, official site
 ITU Institute of Energy

Istanbul Technical University
Nuclear research institutes
Nuclear research reactors
Research institutes in Turkey
Nuclear technology in Turkey
Science and technology in Turkey
Buildings and structures in Istanbul
Organizations based in Istanbul
Organizations established in 1979